This One's For the Ladies is the fifth proper full-length album by rock band Young Fresh Fellows.  It was released in 1989 by Frontier Records, and represents the first appearance of lead guitarist Kurt Bloch (of famed Seattle rock group The Fastbacks) on a Fellows release. This record contains the band's sole chart hit, "Carrothead", which peaked at #29 on the Billboard Modern Rock Tracks chart in 1990.

Track listing
 "This One's For The Ladies"
 "Still There's Hope"
 "Carrothead"
 "Middle Man Of Time"
 "Wishing Ring"
 "New Old Song"
 "The Family Gun"
 "Rotation"
 "Taco Wagon"
 "Picture Book"
 "Lost Track Of Time"
 "Miss Lonelyhearts"
 "Deep, Down And In Between"
 "When I'm Lonely Again/One Day You Die"
 "Don't You Wonder How It Ends?"

References

The Young Fresh Fellows albums
1989 albums
Frontier Records albums
Albums produced by Conrad Uno